Lal Babu Prasad Gupta is a member of the Bharatiya Janata Party from Bihar. He has won the Bihar Legislative Assembly election in 2015 and 2020 from Chiraia.

References

Living people
People from East Champaran district
Bharatiya Janata Party politicians from Bihar
Bihar MLAs 2010–2015
Bihar MLAs 2015–2020
Bihari politicians
Bihar MLAs 2020–2025
1957 births